Pumping Iron II: The Women is a 1985 documentary film about female bodybuilding, focusing on several women as they prepare for and compete in the 1983 Caesars World Cup.

Background
Pumping Iron II was made as a follow-up to the groundbreaking 1977 film Pumping Iron.  The Caesars World Cup was a contest created specifically for the film.  The competitors were a mix of professional and amateur bodybuilders, which was actually a violation of IFBB rules.  Charles Gaines, one of the writers of the film, was included on the contest's judging panel.  He was interviewed for the film but not identified, and had never previously seen a female bodybuilding contest.

The 1985 production focuses primarily on Bev Francis and Rachel McLish.  Francis was actually a world champion powerlifter with no bodybuilding experience (though she later became one of the top competitors in the sport in the late 1980s).  She arrived in the US and was trained during filming by 1972 AAU Mr. America, Steve Michalik, who also guest posed in the film.  Francis was easily the most muscular woman in the contest, but lacked the "feminine" physique of female bodybuilders of the time, and finished only eighth.  McLish, a two-time Ms. Olympia winner, was the most successful woman in the sport's history at that time.  Though she had done more than any other woman to popularize the sport, the producers chose to portray her as the "villain".

Other bodybuilders featured in the film include Kris Alexander, Lori Bowen, Lydia Cheng, Gladys Portugues, and the contest winner, Carla Dunlap.  The film was based on the book Pumping Iron II: The Unprecedented Woman.

The film was released on DVD April 8, 2003 by distributor Central Park Media. The DVD is currently out of print, as the distributor went bankrupt in April 2009, subsequently having to close for the foreseeable future.

Reception

Pumping Iron II has been criticized for not providing an honest look at the sport.

References

External links

1985 films
American sports documentary films
1980s English-language films
Documentary films about female bodybuilding
1985 documentary films
Central Park Media
1983 in bodybuilding
Films directed by George Butler (filmmaker)
Films with screenplays by Charles Gaines
1980s American films